Elmer Roberto Montoya Meza (born 8 December 1977) is a retired Honduran football defender.

Club career
He played most of his career for F.C. Motagua.  He was one of the best players Motagua have ever had, his techniques were amazing but due to a medical problem he retired.

International career
In 1996, Montoya played for the Honduras U-20's at the 1996 CONCACAF U-20 Tournament.
Montoya made his debut for Honduras in a November 1999 friendly match against Guatemala and has earned a total of 38 caps, scoring 13 goals. He has represented his country in 4 FIFA World Cup qualification matches[6] and played at the 2000 Summer Olympics. He also played at the 2001,[7] 2003[8] and 2007 UNCAF Nations Cups[9] as well as at the 2000,[10] 2003s[11]
Montoya also represented the Honduras national under-23 football team at the 2000 Olympics.

References

External links
 El Heraldo news item

1977 births
Living people
Association football defenders
Honduran footballers
Footballers at the 2000 Summer Olympics
Olympic footballers of Honduras
F.C. Motagua players
Liga Nacional de Fútbol Profesional de Honduras players